George Edward Schroth (December 31, 1899 – January 26, 1989) was an American water polo player who competed in the 1924 Summer Olympics and in the 1928 Summer Olympics. He was born in Sacramento, California and died in Los Molinos, California.

Career and recognitions 
In 1924 he won the bronze medal with the American water polo team. He played all five matches and scored one goal. Four years later he was a member of the American team which finished fifth in the 1928 Olympic water polo tournament. He played both matches.

In 1976, he was inducted into the USA Water Polo Hall of Fame.

See also
 List of Olympic medalists in water polo (men)

References

External links
 

1899 births
1989 deaths
American male water polo players
Water polo players at the 1924 Summer Olympics
Water polo players at the 1928 Summer Olympics
Olympic bronze medalists for the United States in water polo
Medalists at the 1924 Summer Olympics
American water polo coaches